Elizabeth Joanetta Catherine von (van) Hagen (1750–1809) was a Dutch pianist, music educator and composer who lived and worked in the United States.

Biography
She was born in Amsterdam and married Rotterdam composer, violinist and organist Peter Albrecht von Hagen. In 1774 the couple emigrated to Charleston, South Carolina, and had a son, Peter Albrecht von Hagen, Jr., in about 1780, followed by a daughter and another son. They moved to New York City and to Boston in 1796 where they worked as music teachers, composers, music publishers, performers and concert managers. Elizabeth von Hagen died in Suffolk County, Massachusetts.

Works
Von Hagen composed works for piano and was known as a composer and arranger of theatrical music. Clear attribution of works within the Peter Albrecht von Hagen family has not been possible.

References

1750 births
1809 deaths
18th-century American musicians
18th-century classical composers
18th-century classical pianists
19th-century classical composers
19th-century classical pianists
American classical composers
American classical pianists
American women classical pianists
American women classical composers
American music educators
American women music educators
Dutch women classical composers
Dutch classical composers
Dutch classical pianists
Dutch emigrants to the Thirteen Colonies
Dutch music educators
Musicians from Amsterdam
Dutch women pianists
19th-century American pianists
19th-century American women pianists
19th-century American composers
19th-century women composers
18th-century women composers
19th-century American women musicians